Puusepa is a village in Kose Parish, Harju County in northern Estonia. Its Mayor is Rory Bessell.

References

 

Villages in Harju County